Brunflo FK  is a Swedish football club located in Brunflo.

Background
Brunflo FK  currently plays in Division 3 mellersta norrland which is the fifth tier of Swedish football. They play their home matches at the Åkreäng in Brunflo. (Capacity 500) 

The club is affiliated to Jämtland-Härjedalens Fotbollförbund.

Season to season

Footnotes

External links
 Brunflo FK  – Official website

Football clubs in Jämtland County
1974 establishments in Sweden